A concept is an idea, something that is conceived in the human mind.

Concept may also refer to:

Computing 
 Concept (generic programming), 
 In computational learning theory, a subset of the instance space; see Concept class
 Concepts (C++), an extension to C++'s template system
 Concept virus (disambiguation), the name of two pieces of malware
 Conceptualization (information science), organizing principles and objects underlying an abstract, simplified view of the world selected for a particular purpose such as information access

Music and Arts 
 Concept (band), an Italian progressive power metal band
 Concept (album), a 1981 album by The Sylvers
 Concepts (album), a Frank Sinatra album
 The Concept (1978 album) funk album by Slave
 The Concept (1991 song) alt-rock song by Teenage Fanclub from the album Bandwagonesque
 Concept album, a popular music album unified by a theme, which can be instrumental, compositional, narrative, or lyrical
 Concept Records, a record label
 DJ Concept, DJ, producer from Long Island, New York
 Concept (board game), a 2014 board game

Technology 
 Concept car, a prototype design
 Concept map, a method for visualizing concepts
 Concept phase, in product life-cycle management

Sport 
 Concept, Gridiron football offense.

Other uses
Berkshire Concept 70, an American sailplane design
Concept 40, an American sailboat design
 Concept (journal), an interdisciplinary journal of graduate studies

See also
 Concept S (disambiguation)